This is a list of states in the Holy Roman Empire beginning with the letter V:

References

V